The Halmahera boobook (Ninox hypogramma) is a species of owl in the family Strigidae. It inhabits the Indonesian islands of Halmahera, Ternate and Bacan.  Its natural habitat is subtropical or tropical moist lowland forests. It is threatened by habitat loss.  It was previously considered to be a subspecies of the Moluccan boobook.

References

Norman, J.A., L. Christidis, M. Westerman, and F.A. Richard-Hall. 1998. Molecular data confirm the species status of the Christmas Island Hawk-Owl Ninox natalis. Emu 98: 197–208.
Rheindt, F.E., and R.O. Hutchinson. 2007. A photoshot odyssey through the confused avian taxonomy of Seram and Buru (southern Moluccas). BirdingASIA 7: 18–38.

Halmahera boobook
Birds of Halmahera
Halmahera boobook
Halmahera boobook